The 4th Regiment Arkansas Volunteer Cavalry was organized in 1863 at Little Rock December. Attached to Post of Little Rock, Arkansas, 7th Army Corps, Department of Arkansas, to May, 1864. 3rd Brigade, 1st Division, 7th Army Corps, Department of Arkansas, to September, 1864. 2nd Brigade, Cavalry Division, 7th Army Corps, to February, 1865. Unassigned, 7th Army Corps, to March, 1865. Cavalry Brigade, Little Rock, Arkansas, 7th Corps, to June, 1865.

Service 
Duty at Little Rock, Arkansas, till June 1865. Skirmish at Saline River, Arkansas, February 15, 1864. Cedar Glade March 1. scout to Benton March 27–31. Mt. Elba March 30. Jenkins' Ferry, Camden, April 15. Dardanelle May 15–17. Operations in Arkansas against Guerrillas July 1–31. Near Benton July 6. Montgomery County July 11. Caddo Gap July 12. Fair's Mills and Bayou des Arc July 14. Saline River July 16. Scout to Benton September 6–7. Reconnaissance toward Monticello and Mt. Elba October 4–11. Reconnaissance to Princeton October 19–23. Skirmish, Hurricane Creek, October 23. Scout from Devall's Bluff to Searcy and Clinton November 9–15. Expedition from Little Rock to Fort Smith September 25–October 13. Skirmishes at Clarksville September 28 and October 9. White Oak Creek September 29. Scout from Little Rock to the Saline River April 26–29, 1865. Scout from Little Rock to Bayou Metoe and Little Bayou May 6–11. Mustered out June 30, 1865.

Notable Members 

 Major Lyman G. Bennett
 Colonel Lafayette Gregg

See also

 List of Arkansas Civil War Union units
 Arkansas in the American Civil War

References

Bibliography 
Dyer, Frederick H. (1959). A Compendium of the War of the Rebellion. Sagamore Press, Inc. Thomas Yoseloff, Publisher. New York. 

Units and formations of the Union Army from Arkansas
1865 disestablishments in Arkansas
Military units and formations established in 1863
1863 establishments in Arkansas
Military units and formations disestablished in 1865